Communist insurgency is an umbrella term which may refer to one of several guerrilla conflicts involving communist parties, including:
 Communist insurgency in Bangladesh
 Communist insurgency in Bulgaria
 Communist insurgency in Chile
 Communism in Sumatra
 Communist insurgency in Malaysia
 Malayan Emergency
 Second Malayan Emergency
 Communist insurgency in Myanmar
 Communist insurgency in Paraguay
 Communist insurgency in Peru
 Communist armed conflicts in the Philippines
 Hukbalahap rebellion (1942–1954)
 Communist rebellion in the Philippines (1969–present)
 Communist insurgency in Sarawak
 Communist insurgency in South Korea
 Communist insurgency in Thailand
 Colombian conflict (FARC, EPL, and ELN insurgency)
 Maoist insurgency in Turkey
 Montoneros and People's Revolutionary Army insurgency in Argentina
 Naxalite–Maoist insurgency in India
 Nepalese Civil War
 First JVP insurrection and Second JVP insurrection in Sri Lanka